Tureni is a commune in Cluj County, Transylvania, Romania. It is composed of five villages: Ceanu Mic (Pusztacsán), Comșești (Komjátszeg), Mărtinești (Pusztaszentmárton), Micești (Mikes) and Tureni.

Demographics 
According to the census from 2002 there was a total population of 2,585 people living in this commune. Of this population, 71.64% are ethnic Romanians, 23.86% are ethnic Hungarians and 4.33% ethnic Romani.

References

Communes in Cluj County
Localities in Transylvania